Plaza de España-Noviciado is a station on the Madrid Metro. Line 2 serves Noviciado whilst Line 3 and Line 10 serves Plaza de España. It is located in fare Zone A.

References 

Line 2 (Madrid Metro) stations
Line 3 (Madrid Metro) stations
Line 10 (Madrid Metro) stations
Railway stations in Spain opened in 1925